Roscigno is a small town and comune in Salerno, Campania, Italy. It is located on the slope of Monte Pruno.

Geography
Roscigno is situated in the central area of Cilento. It is within Cilento, Vallo di Diano and Alburni National Park and the Cilento World Heritage Site. The municipality borders with Bellosguardo, Corleto Monforte, Laurino, Sacco and Sant'Angelo a Fasanella.

The town is divided in Roscigno Nuova (New Roscigno, simply referred as Roscigno), the new settlement built after a landslide at the old settlement; now named Roscigno Vecchia (Old Roscigno), distant  from the "new town".

Main sights

Roscigno Vecchia (Old Roscigno, also named Roscigno Vecchio – ) is an example of a 19th-century rural town developed around a central square and a church unmodified by modern architectural or infrastructural changes.

It has been completely abandoned since the early 20th century, when the population moved to Roscigno Nuovo due to a landslide. Now open for tourism, the ghost town was declared an eco museum in the early 21st century. Nearby, and also in the province of Salerno, there is another example of ghost town: the old village of Romagnano al Monte.

Some  outside the town is the archaeological site on Monte Pruno, a settlement of the Oenotrians and the Lucani (7th-3rd centuries BC).

See also
Cilentan dialect

References

External links

  Official website
 Roscigno Vecchia website

Cities and towns in Campania
Localities of Cilento
Ghost towns in Italy